Neon Nights: 30 Years of Heaven & Hell ("Live in Europe" for the U.S. market and "Live at Wacken" for the European market) is a live album by Heaven & Hell. Recorded at the Wacken Open Air Festival in Germany on 30 July 2009, it was released in the U.S. on 16 November 2010 and in Japan on October 27, 2010 (Deluxe Website Version) and November 10, 2010 (retail version). It includes songs from the three official Dio-era Black Sabbath albums, as well as songs from The Devil You Know. The album was released in both CD and DVD formats, and the DVD also includes interviews regarding the 30th anniversary of the release of Heaven and Hell and a tribute to Ronnie James Dio, in addition to the concert recording.

Track listing

CD track list

DVD track list

Personnel 
 Ronnie James Dio - vocals
 Tony Iommi - lead guitar
 Geezer Butler - bass
 Vinny Appice - drums
 Scott Warren - keyboards, rhythm guitar

Charts

References 

Heaven & Hell (band) albums
Live video albums
2010 video albums
2010 live albums
Live albums published posthumously
Video albums published posthumously